Scott Allen Hain (June 2, 1970 – April 3, 2003) was the last person executed in the United States for crimes committed as a juvenile. Hain was executed by Oklahoma for a double murder–kidnapping he committed when he was 17 years old.

Crime 
Hain was born in Tulsa, Oklahoma. As a teenager, he accumulated juvenile convictions for trespassing, theft, and unauthorized use of a motor vehicle.

On October 6, 1987, Hain and Robert Lambert carjacked an automobile in Tulsa that was occupied by Michael Houghton (December 9, 1959 - October 6, 1987) and Laura Sanders (January 8, 1965 - October 6, 1987). Hain and Lambert eventually stopped the car, robbed Houghton and Sanders, and placed them in the trunk of the car. Hain set fire to the car, which resulted in Houghton and Sanders' deaths. Hain was 17 years old at the time of the murders.

Court proceedings and executions 
Hain and Lambert were arrested on October 9, 1987. At trial in 1988, they were both convicted of capital felony murder and sentenced to death by lethal injection. In 1994, an appeals court determined that because the jury had not been told of the possibility of a life sentence without any chance of parole, Hain was entitled to a new sentencing hearing. At the re-sentencing hearing, the new jury again sentenced Hain to death for the murders. All of Hain's subsequent appeals were eventually dismissed, and in February 2002 the United States Supreme Court refused to hear his appeal, which was based on arguments of unconstitutionality executing juvenile offenders.

In February 2003, the U.S. Supreme Court overturned a stay of execution that had been put in place by the 10th Circuit Court of Appeals, and Hain was executed by lethal injection at the age of 32. He was the 60th person executed by Oklahoma since 1976 when the death penalty was reinstated by the United States Supreme Court.

Hain's partner, Lambert, who had been convicted and sentenced in 1994, was retried, convicted and sentenced again to death. In 2005, however, Lambert's case went to the Oklahoma State Court of Criminal Appeals, where the court ruled him "mentally retarded". According to news reports, Lambert will serve a life sentence in prison without the possibility of parole.

Statistics 
As a result of the 1976 Supreme Court decision in Gregg v. Georgia, capital punishment was allowed to resume in the United States.  With his execution, Hain became:

 The 22nd juvenile offender executed in the U.S. since 1976,
 23rd murderer executed in the U.S. in 2003,
 843rd murderer executed in the U.S. since 1976,
 5th murderer executed in Oklahoma in 2003, 
 And 60th murderer executed in Oklahoma since 1976.

Hain was the last person executed in the United States for crimes committed as a minor, prior to the 2005 Roper v. Simmons case in which the United States Supreme Court outlawed such executions.

End of juvenile offender executions in the United States 
In March 2005, less than two years after Hain's execution, the United States Supreme Court held in the 5–4 decision of Roper v. Simmons that the Eighth Amendment to the United States Constitution was violated when offenders were executed for crimes committed prior to the age of 18. If Roper v. Simmons had been decided prior to Hain's execution, Hain could not have been legally executed.

See also 
 Capital punishment for juveniles in the United States
 Capital punishment in Oklahoma
 Capital punishment in the United States
 List of people executed in Oklahoma
 List of people executed in the United States in 2003
 Roper v. Simmons: 2005 U.S. Supreme Court ruling that the execution of those under 18 (at the time of committing the capital crime) is unconstitutional.
 Thompson v. Oklahoma: 1988 U.S. Supreme Court ruling that the execution of those who committed their crime when under the age of 16 is unconstitutional.

References

External links 
 Charlie Savage, "Executions barred for juvenile killers: In 5-4 ruling, justices invoke global standard", Boston Globe, 2005-03-02

1970 births
2003 deaths
21st-century executions by Oklahoma
American people convicted of murder
American kidnappers
Juvenile offenders executed by the United States
People executed for murder
People convicted of murder by Oklahoma
People executed by Oklahoma by lethal injection
21st-century executions of American people
People from Tulsa, Oklahoma
Executed people from Oklahoma